Cremorne Bridge may refer to:

 Battersea Railway Bridge, properly called the Cremorne Bridge, across the River Thames in London, England
 Cremorne Railway Bridge, across the Yarra River, southeast of Melbourne, Australia